St Pancras West was a borough constituency represented in the House of Commons of the Parliament of the United Kingdom. It elected one Member of Parliament (MP) by the first past the post system of election. It was created by the Redistribution of Seats Act 1885 for the 1885 general election and abolished for the 1918 general election.

Boundaries

Members of Parliament

Elections

Elections in the 1880s

Elections in the 1890s

Elections in the 1900s

Elections in the 1910s 

General election 1914–15:

Another general election was required to take place before the end of 1915. The political parties had been making preparations for an election to take place and by the July 1914, the following candidates had been selected:
Unionist: Felix Cassel
Liberal: James H. Scott

Felix Cassel's resignation on becoming a Judge Advocate General of the Armed Forces required a by-election.

References 

 

Parliamentary constituencies in London (historic)
Constituencies of the Parliament of the United Kingdom established in 1885
Constituencies of the Parliament of the United Kingdom disestablished in 1918
History of the London Borough of Camden
Politics of the London Borough of Camden